Hurt Me may refer to:

 Suffering or pain
 Hurt Me (album), an 1984 album by Johnny Thunders
 "Hurt Me" (song), a 2015 song by Låpsley
 "Hurt Me", a song by Leann Rimes from the 1996 album, Blue